Laurent Manrique (born March 30, 1966) is a French restaurateur and Michelin-starred chef. He currently owns establishments in San Francisco. He was the Corporate Executive Chef of Aqua, an upscale seafood restaurant in San Francisco, where he earned two Michelin stars in 2006, the first time Michelin came to the San Francisco Bay Area, and again in 2007 and 2008. Upon his departure in 2009, the restaurant lost its Michelin status. (It was closed in 2010). Since 2005, Manrique has owned Café de la Presse, located on the corner of Bush Street and Grant Avenue, and two wine bars:  Blanc et Rouge and Herlen Place.

Biography

Manrique discovered his culinary passion during childhood while cooking with his grandmother Aurélie in the Gascon village of Roques. Following an apprenticeship several years later with master chef Roger Duffour, Manrique trained with master chefs Claude Deligne and Yan Jacquot at Michelin-starred Taillevent and Toit de Passy in Paris.

Following a suggestion to move to the United States, Manrique pursued his culinary career at Los Angeles Italian restaurant Rex. Persuaded by restaurateur Jean Denoyer to join Manhattan's Le Comptoir as executive chef, he relocated to the East Coast in 1991.

In 1992, at 26, Manrique took over as chef at the Waldorf Astoria's Peacock Alley. After a five-year relationship with the restaurant, Manrique joined with nightlife mogul Howard Stein to open Gertrudes in 1997.

Shortly after, he returned to the West Coast to join San Francisco's Campton Palace restaurant as Executive Chef.

In 2003, Manrique was named Corporate Executive Chef for Aqua in San Francisco. Manrique's cuisine and leadership were to play a significant role in the restaurant's success, including two Michelin stars in 2006, which he upheld for three consecutive years. Meanwhile, he opened Café de la Presse and Blanc et Rouge Wine Bar, which remain some of San Francisco's most popular dining venues.

In 2007, Manrique entered into the joint venture C&L Partners, a restaurant development, operating, and investment company, with friend and colleague Christopher Condy. Manrique guided C&L through reopening the Fifth Floor restaurant at the Palomar Hotel for the Kimpton Group in 2008, followed by the opening of the Urban Tavern at the San Francisco Hilton.

Manrique and Condy teamed up with Meredith Gelacek, former Hilton Hotels Vice President of Food & Beverage, and Peter Chase, former Vice President of Bars for Ian Schrager Hotels, to form Collective Hospitality. Together the group opened Millesime in November 2010, a casual seafood brasserie in New York City's Carlton Hotel. The restaurant quickly earned praise, including a two-star review from the New York Times, and a two-and-a-half-star review from the New York Post.

Manrique shared the recipe for one of the restaurant's signature dishes, tuna tartare, on NBC in the winter of 2010. The restaurant has since closed.

Personal life

Since 2003, Manrique has been involved in vineyards in California, France, and Spain, where he has been instrumental in the creation of several wines. Manrique partnered with Master Sommelier Emmanuel Kemiji and a vineyard in Spain, Clos Oblidat and Arrels (which means roots of a vine in Catalan) is the inaugural release.  Manrique is married to writer Michelle Odom Manrique, and makes his home with their children in northern California.

Television appearances

 Nick Stellino's Cooking with Friends. Season 1, episode 3, 2008
 Guest Judge on Top Chef. Season 1, episode 3, 2006

External links 

 Laurent Manrique Personal Site

References

 http://newyork.grubstreet.com/2010/11/what_to_eat_at_millesime_laure.html#
 https://www.nytimes.com/2010/06/09/dining/09off.html?_r=1&ref=dining

1966 births
Living people
French chefs
Cuisine of the San Francisco Bay Area
American chefs
Place of birth missing (living people)
Head chefs of Michelin starred restaurants
French restaurateurs
Chefs from San Francisco